In enzymology, a tetrahydrocolumbamine 2-O-methyltransferase is an enzyme that catalyzes the chemical reaction

S-adenosyl-L-methionine + 5,8,13,13a-tetrahydrocolumbamine  S-adenosyl-L-homocysteine + tetrahydropalmatine

Thus, the two substrates of this enzyme are S-adenosyl methionine and 5,8,13,13a-tetrahydrocolumbamine, whereas its two products are S-adenosylhomocysteine and tetrahydropalmatine.

This enzyme belongs to the family of transferases, specifically those transferring one-carbon group methyltransferases.  The systematic name of this enzyme class is S-adenosyl-L-methionine:5,8,13,13a-tetrahydrocolumbamine 2-O-methyltransferase. This enzyme is also called tetrahydrocolumbamine methyltransferase.  This enzyme participates in alkaloid biosynthesis i.

References

 

EC 2.1.1
Enzymes of unknown structure